The leader of North Carolina Agricultural and Technical State University, referred to as the chancellor, is the chief executive officer of the University. The chancellor is recommended by the university's Board of Trustees and selected by the president of the University of North Carolina and the Board of Governors. The chancellor reports to the Board of Trustees for the operation and management of the University.

In 1971, the North Carolina General Assembly passed legislation bringing all 16 public institutions that confer bachelor degrees into the University of North Carolina System. As a result, the university became a constituent institution and Lewis Carnegie Dowdy, the college's sixth president, was reappointed as the college's first chancellor in July 1972.

There have been six presidents and seven chancellors in the university's history. John Oliver Crosby was elected as the first president of the "Agricultural and Mechanical College for the Colored Race" on May 25, 1892. The twelfth, and current, Chancellor of North Carolina A&T is Dr. Harold L. Martin Sr. Elected May 22, 2009, Martin is the first alumnus of the university to hold the position.

List of presidents and chancellors 

† denotes N.C. A&T alumnus

References

External links
 N.C. A&T Presidents and Chancellor biographies